King Stanisław can refer to:
 Stanisław Leszczyński
 Stanisław August Poniatowski

See also
 Stanisław of Masovia (1501–1524)